Qar Kalbin is a village in northern Aleppo Governorate, northwestern Syria.

Administratively the village belongs to Nahiya Akhtarin in A'zaz District. Nearby localities include Aq Burhan  to the west, and Tall Battal  in the Aqil mountains. In the 2004 census, Qar Kalbin had a population of 618.

References

Populated places in Aleppo Governorate